PPPA may refer to:

 Pacific Press Publishing Association
 Professional Ping Pong Association
 Palestine Poster Project Archives
 People, Pay and Pensions Agency; see DBS Civilian HR
 Poison Prevention Packaging Act of 1970
 Printing Presses and Publications Act

Drugs named PPPA:
 PPPA (drug), antidepressant
 [361436-79-5]
 [113190-92-4]